Atari was an early pioneer in the video game industry, in fact, they virtually created the industry with their introduction of the arcade game Pong. The brand name "Atari" was used for many years and applied to several other entities that developed products ranging from arcade video games to home video game consoles to home computers to video games for personal computers.

Below is a list of arcade video games produced by Atari. These games were produced by Atari, Inc. from 1972 to 1984 starting with Pong and Atari Games from 1984 to 1999. Atari no longer manufacturers arcade games and, in fact, the entity that now owns the brand name (French company, Infogrames) never has.

For a full list of games developed or published by Atari from 1972 to 1984, see List of Atari, Inc. games.

0-9

A

B

C

D

E

F

G

H

I

J

K

L

M

N

O

P

Q

R

S

T

U

V

W

X 

 
Atari